Mae Chan is a district (amphoe) in the northern part of Chiang Rai province, northern Thailand.

Geography

Neighboring districts are (from the north clockwise): Mae Sai, Chiang Saen, Doi Luang, Mueang Chiang Rai and Mae Fa Luang of Chiang Rai Province.

Doi Nang Non, the 'mountain of the sleeping lady', is part of the Daen Lao Range and is one of the main geographic features of Mae Chan District.

History
The district was created as the successor of Mueang Chiang Saen. The original center of the mueang later became part of the minor district Chiang Saen Luang, so in 1939 this minor district was renamed to Chiang Saen, while the district Chiang Saen itself was renamed Mae Chan.

Administration

Central administration 
Mae Chan is divided into 11 subdistricts (tambons), which are further subdivided into 139 administrative villages (mubans).

Missing numbers are tambon which now form Doi Luang District.

Local administration 
There are eight sub-district municipalities (thesaban tambons) in the district:
 Chan Chwa consisting of sub-districts Chan Chwa and Chan Chwa Tai.
 Mae Kham consisting of parts of sub-district Mae Kham.
 Mae Chan consisting of parts of sub-district Mae Chan.
 San Sai consisting of parts of sub-district San Sai.
 Pa Sang consisting of sub-district Pa Sang.
 Sai Nam Kham consisting of parts of sub-district Mae Kham.
 Tha Khao Plueak consisting of sub-district Tha Khao Plueak.
 Mae Rai consisting of sub-district Mae Rai.

There are five sub-district administrative organizations (SAO) in the district:
 Mae Chan consisting of parts of sub-district Mae Chan.
 San Sai consisting of parts of sub-district San Sai.
 Pa Tueng consisting of sub-district Pa Tueng.
 Si Kham consisting of sub-district Si Kham.
 Chom Sawan consisting of sub-district Chom Sawan.

References

External links

amphoe.com

Mae Chan